The Journal of Applied Remote Sensing is a peer-reviewed open access scientific journal published by SPIE. It covers all aspects of remote sensing and was established in 2007. The editor-in-chief is Ni-Bin Chang (University of Central Florida).

Abstracting and indexing
This journal is indexed by the following databases:
 Science Citation Index Expanded
 Current Contents/ Agriculture, Biology & Environmental Sciences
 Current Contents/ Physical, Chemical & Earth Sciences
 Inspec
 Scopus
 EI/Compendex
 Astrophysics Data System
According to the Journal Citation Reports, the journal has a 2020 impact factor of 1.53.

See also 
 ISPRS Journal of Photogrammetry and Remote Sensing
 Remote Sensing

"Journal of Applied Remote Sensing". 2019 Journal Citation Reports. Web of Science (Science ed.). Thomson Reuters. 2020.

References

External links 
 

SPIE academic journals
Creative Commons Attribution-licensed journals
English-language journals
Remote sensing journals